The Sudan Davis Cup team was a team that represented Sudan in Davis Cup tennis competition.  The team was governed by the Sudan Lawn Tennis Association.  They have not competed since 2001.

History
Sudan competed in its first Davis Cup in 1994.  Their best result was seventh in Group III in their debut year.

Current team (2022) 

 Mohamed Abdalla
 Hussam Ali
 Khalid Derar
 Noor Mandour

See also
Davis Cup

References

External links

Davis Cup teams
Davis Cup
Davis Cup
1994 establishments in Sudan
Sports clubs established in 1994